Carl Becker is the name of:
 Carl Fredrick Becker (1919–2013), American luthier and restorer
Carl Heinrich Becker (1876–1933), German scholar on Islam, Prussian minister of culture and education
Carl K. Becker (1894–1990), American doctor and missionary
Carl L. Becker (1873–1945), American historian
Carl Becker (general) (1895–1966), German World War II general
Carl Becker (marine painter) (1862–1926), German marine painter
Carl Ferdinand Becker (1804–1877), German violinist, organist and writer on music

See also 
Karl Becker (disambiguation)